Manfred Steiner (born 27 November 1962) is an Austrian former ski jumper.

World Cup

Standings

Wins

External links

1962 births
Living people
People from Kufstein District
Ski jumpers at the 1984 Winter Olympics
Austrian male ski jumpers
Olympic ski jumpers of Austria
Sportspeople from Tyrol (state)
20th-century Austrian people